Piletocera rechingeri is a moth in the family Crambidae. It was described by Tams in 1935. It is found on Samoa.

References

rechingeri
Endemic fauna of Samoa
Moths of Oceania
Moths described in 1935